In topology, a branch of mathematics, local flatness is smoothness condition that can be imposed on topological submanifolds.   In the category of topological manifolds, locally flat submanifolds play a role similar to that of embedded submanifolds in the category of smooth manifolds. Violations of local flatness describe ridge networks and crumpled structures, with applications to materials processing and mechanical engineering.

Definition 
Suppose a d dimensional manifold N is embedded into an n dimensional manifold M (where d < n). In diagrammatic terms, the following square must commute:

We call N locally flat in M if N is locally flat at every point. Similarly, a map  is called locally flat, even if it is not an embedding, if every x in N has a neighborhood U whose image  is locally flat in M.

In manifolds with boundary 
The above definition assumes that, if M has a boundary, x is not a boundary point of M. If x is a point on the boundary of M then the definition is modified as follows.

Consequences 
Local flatness of an embedding implies strong properties not shared by all embeddings.  Brown (1962) proved that if d = n − 1, then N is collared; that is, it has a neighborhood which is homeomorphic to N × [0,1] with N itself corresponding to N × 1/2 (if N is in the interior of M) or N × 0 (if N is in the boundary of M).

See also
Euclidean space
Neat submanifold

References
 Brown, Morton (1962), Locally flat imbeddings of topological manifolds. Annals of Mathematics, Second series, Vol. 75 (1962), pp. 331–341.
 Mazur, Barry. On embeddings of spheres. Bulletin of the American Mathematical Society, Vol. 65 (1959), no. 2, pp. 59–65. http://projecteuclid.org/euclid.bams/1183523034.

Topology
Geometric topology